Enteromius pygmaeus is a species of ray-finned fish in the genus Enteromius which is endemic to the central Congo Basin in the Democratic Republic of the Congo.

Footnotes 

 

Enteromius
Taxa named by Max Poll
Taxa named by Jean-Pierre Gosse
Fish described in 1963
Endemic fauna of the Democratic Republic of the Congo